Paozi railway station is a rather small fourth-class railway station in Paozi Town, Fuxin Mongol Autonomous County, Fuxin, Liaoning, China on the Dahushan-Zhengjiatun railway. It was founded in 1927. During the Liaoshen campaign, many of the supplies brought to the Communist troops went through Paozi station.

References 

Railway stations in Liaoning
Railway stations in Fuxin
Stations on the Dahushan–Zhengjiatun Railway
Railway stations in China opened in 1927